Johannes Bruno Ertl, known as Johnny Ertl (born 13 November 1982) is an Austrian former footballer who primarily played as a defensive midfielder, although he could also play at the right or centre of defence.

During his career, Ertl notably represented Sturm Graz, Crystal Palace, Sheffield United and Portsmouth; after retiring from playing in 2015, he became the spokesman of the Portsmouth F.C. supporters' trust, also taking on a role as the assistant coach of the Portsmouth under-16s.

Career

Early career
Ertl began his career in the youth team of SV Feldkirchen, before joining Sturm Graz in 1996. He played for the club's youth categories and earned himself a professional contract at his hometown club in 2003. He joined SC Kalsdorf on loan in 2003 and enjoyed a successful spell there.

When he returned to the Blackies he earned a place in the centre of defence and after impressive displays at the heart of the Graz defence was called up to the Austria squad, making his début in a match against Hungary replacing Paul Scharner on 87 minutes.

Crystal Palace
In the summer of 2006 Ertl transferred from the Blackies to Austrian giants Austria Wien, spending two years in the capital with the 'violets' before moving to England to join Crystal Palace. His first goal for Palace came in the FA Cup against Aston Villa on 14 February 2010.

Sheffield United
Ertl's contract expired at the end of the 2009–10 season, and with Palace in financial trouble, he signed for Sheffield United. Unfortunately he had swapped one relegation battle for another as The Blades struggled at the wrong end of the table. Ertl was a regular in the first team until an injury to his cruciate ligament ended his season in March 2011 and kept him out of the side for almost eight months as the team slipped into League One.

After a lengthy recovery he returned to the first team squad making four substitute appearances in December before returning to the starting eleven in an FA Cup game against Salisbury City in January 2012. After a handful more appearances Ertl was released at the end of the season when his contract expired.

Portsmouth

On 31 August 2012, Ertl joined Portsmouth on a short-term contract. He made his debut a day later, scoring an own goal in a 0–1 home defeat against Oldham. After playing in centre back and right back roles Ertl finally found his feet in midfield. On New Year's Day, he was handed the captain armband, with Brian Howard being sidelined by injury; after Howard's departure, he was named permanent captain. Ertl finished the 2012–13 season by receiving the fans' Player of the Season award.

On 10 June 2013, Ertl signed a three-year contract extension with Portsmouth. He scored his first goal for Portsmouth on 7 September 2013 against Cheltenham in a 2–2 away draw.

On 22 July 2015, Portsmouth terminated Ertl's contract after a three-year spell at the League Two club.

Retiring from professional football, Johnny embarked on a career as a TV pundit, football expert and commentator for various TV broadcasting networks; Pro7Sat1 Gruppe, PULS 4, DAZN, to name a few.

He brings a wealth of tactical knowledge as well as inside information of his own experiences as a professional footballer to current games multiple times a week throughout the season. He is renowned as one of the best German speaking experts, covering the Europa League, Nations League, English Premier League, German Bundesliga, Finalissimo and many more.

Club career statistics

1.Statistics includes FA Community Shield, Football League Trophy and Football League Playoffs.

Honours
 2006 Austrian Football Bundesliga
 2006 Austrian Cup

Individual
Portsmouth
Player of The Season 2012–13

References

External links
 
 Player profile – Austria Archiv

1982 births
Living people
Footballers from Graz
Austrian footballers
Austria international footballers
Association football defenders
Austrian Football Bundesliga players
English Football League players
SK Sturm Graz players
FK Austria Wien players
Crystal Palace F.C. players
Expatriate footballers in England
Sheffield United F.C. players
Portsmouth F.C. players
Austrian expatriate sportspeople in England